The Golden Triangle Railroad  is a railway in central Mississippi, totalling  length. It is owned by the Patriot Rail Corporation. The GTRA interchanges with the Kansas City Southern Railway (KCS) at Columbus, Mississippi, and with Burlington Northern Santa Fe, Columbus & Greenville, Luxapalila Valley and Norfolk Southern via trackage rights over the KCS.

The GTRA serves an International Paper fiber mill in Trinity. It primarily hauls woodpulp, corn starch and chemicals, and utilises three locomotives. , the GTRA employs nine workers.

References

 GTRA on PatriotRail.com. Retrieved 1 December 2011.

Mississippi railroads
Patriot Rail Company